Amphisbaena metallurga is a species of worm lizard found in Brazil.

References

metallurga
Reptiles described in 2015
Taxa named by Henrique Caldeira Costa
Taxa named by Flávia C. Resende
Taxa named by Mauro Teixeira Jr.
Taxa named by Francisco Dal Vechio
Taxa named by Cinara A. Clemente
Endemic fauna of Brazil
Reptiles of Brazil